Kyle Loveless is a former Republican politician from Oklahoma's 45th district including parts of Oklahoma City. He was elected to the Senate in 2012, replacing Steve Russell, and was reelected in 2016; Loveless ran unopposed in both races.

In 2017, Loveless resigned while under criminal investigation for embezzling over $150,000 campaign funds which he used for personal use. He pled guilty to three felony charges and in a plea deal he agreed to pay over $15,000 in restititution, was sentenced to three years probation and banned from any kind of political work.

References

Living people
21st-century American politicians
Republican Party Oklahoma state senators
Politicians from Oklahoma City
Oklahoma politicians convicted of crimes
Year of birth missing (living people)